John Archibald Park (1879–1935) was a Scottish professional golfer. Park placed sixth in the 1899 U.S. Open, held 14–15 September 1899, at Baltimore Country Club in Baltimore, Maryland. Park also finished tied for ninth place in the 1901 U.S. Open held at Myopia Hunt Club and tied for tenth at the 1915 U.S. Open.

Early life
Park was born in Musselburgh, Scotland, in 1879. He was the son of Willie Park Sr. (1834–1903) and his wife Susanna Park née Law (1837–1922).

Golf career
At age 18, Park won an open tournament at Carnoustie in 1897. The field included James Braid, J.H. Taylor, Harry Vardon and Willie Fernie. In 1898 he emigrated to the United States to manage his brother's golf store at 25 W. 43rd Street, New York. He was head professional at Essex Country Club in New Jersey (1899–01), then went to Texas for a short period at Houston Country Club before going to Whitemarsh Country Club in Philadelphia where his tenure was from 1911–15.

Park also spent some time in Argentina where his brother Mungo Park Jr. had a lot of success. Jack was second to Mungo at the 1907 Argentine Open.

His longest posting was at Maidstone Golf Club on Long Island from 1915–24. In 1924 Jack and his brother Willie upgraded the existing 18-hole Maidstone course to a 36-hole layout, part of which was destroyed in a 1938 hurricane. In its current 27-hole configuration the course continues to be listed among the top 70 courses in America. After leaving Maidstone, Park remained in the East Hampton area of New York where he worked at Amagansett Country Club in Amagansett, New York, until 1928.

Death
Park died in 1935 at East Hampton, Suffolk, New York.

Results in major championships

Note: Park played only in the U.S. Open and The Open Championship.

NT = No tournament
DNP = Did not play
CUT = Missed the cut
WD = Withdrew
? = Finish unknown
"T" indicates a tie for a place
Yellow background for top-10.

Team appearances
England–Scotland Professional Match (representing Scotland): 1909

References

Scottish male golfers
Golfers from Musselburgh
Scottish emigrants to the United States
Scottish expatriate sportspeople in Argentina
1879 births
1935 deaths